The 48th César Awards ceremony, presented by the Académie des Arts et Techniques du Cinéma, took place on 24 February 2023 at the  Olympia in Paris, to honour the best French films of 2022. Actor Tahar Rahim presided over the ceremony, which was hosted by actors Emmanuelle Devos, Léa Drucker, Eye Haïdara, Leïla Bekhti, Jérôme Commandeur, Ahmed Sylla, Jamel Debbouze, Alex Lutz and Raphaël Personnaz. American director David Fincher received the Honorary César.

The nominations were announced on 25 January 2023, with the drama film The Innocent leading with eleven nominations, followed by The Night of the 12th with ten and Pacifiction and Rise, both with nine. The Night of the 12th went on to win six awards, more than any other film in the ceremony, including Best Film.

Marion Cotillard was featured in the official poster for the ceremony in a still from the 2021 film Annette. The Césars also released an animated poster with a scene of Cotillard singing in Annette.

Winners and nominees
The nominees were announced on 25 January 2023.

Films with multiple nominations
The following films received multiple nominations:

Films with multiple wins
The following films received multiple wins:

See also
 35th European Film Awards
 12th Magritte Awards

References

External links
 Official website

2023
2022 film awards
February 2023 events in France